Wikström is a Swedish and Finnish surname.

Geographical distribution
As of 2014, 75.2% of all known bearers of the surname Wikström were residents of Sweden (frequency 1:1,640) and 23.1% of Finland (1:2,978).

In Sweden, the frequency of the surname was higher than national average (1:1,640) in the following counties:
 1. Jämtland County (1:632)
 2. Norrbotten County (1:648)
 3. Västerbotten County (1:666)
 4. Gävleborg County (1:729)
 5. Västernorrland County (1:878)
 6. Dalarna County (1:914)
 7. Värmland County (1:1,217)
 8. Västmanland County (1:1,358)
 9. Gotland County (1:1,426)

In Finland, the frequency of the surname was higher than national average (1:2,978) in the following regions:
 1. Åland (1:598)
 2. Central Ostrobothnia (1:787)
 3. Ostrobothnia (1:1,080)
 4. Uusimaa (1:1,390)
 5. Southwest Finland (1:2,038)

People
Axel Wikström (1907–1976),  Swedish skier
Cecilia Wikström (born 1965),  Swedish politician
Christoffer Wikström (born 1987),  Swedish swimmer
Emil Wikström (1864–1942),  Finnish sculptor
John Wikström,  Swedish skier
Leif Wikström (1918–1991),  Swedish sailor
Mikael Wikström (Mike Wead) (born 1967),  Swedish guitarist
Per Wikström (born 1961),  Swedish swimmer
Sami Wikström (born 1967), Finnish ice hockey player
Sebastian Wikström (born 1988),  Swedish swimmer
Volmar Wikström (1889–1957),  Finnish wrestler

See also
Wigström
Vikström
Wikstrom, a fictional character from Pokémon X and Y

References

Swedish-language surnames